Griffith Roberts (27 June 1845 – 11 February 1943) was an Anglican  priest and author. His works include "The Marks of Christ’s Body", 1891; "Salvation Through Atonement", 1910; "Why We Believe that Christ rose from the Dead", 1914; "Holiadur Eglswysig", 1888; and "A Guide to Bangor Cathedral" in the first third of the 20th century. Educated at Trinity College Dublin, he was ordained in 1870. He held incumbencies at Llanegryn, Dowlais and Peterston-super-Ely before being appointed Dean of Bangor in 1903. He retired in 1934 and died at the age of 97.

His son David was Archdeacon of Monmouth from 1930 to 1935.

References

1845 births
People from Caernarfonshire
Alumni of Trinity College Dublin
Deans of Bangor
1943 deaths